Two consecutive suicide bombings were carried out by Hamas militants on 30 July 1997 at the Mahane Yehuda Market in Jerusalem, the city's main open-air fruit and vegetable market. Sixteen people were killed in the attack and 178 were injured.

The attack
On Wednesday, 30 July 1997 at 1:15 pm, two Palestinian suicide bombers who carried bags laden with explosives and nails detonated their explosive devices 45 meters (150 feet) apart almost simultaneously in a central alley in the popular outdoor market, killing 16 civilians, among them an Arab resident of Eilabun, and injuring 178 people, many of them teenagers and tourists.

Thirteen Israelis were killed immediately and three others died later from their injuries. The Mahane Yehuda attack was followed by a triple suicide bombing on the Ben Yehuda pedestrian mall in downtown Jerusalem on 4 September, which killed five Israelis and wounded over 190.

Aftermath
In retaliation for these and other attacks, a decision was reached to target Hamas leaders.  According to an Israeli press release, Mossad agents tried to poison chairman Khaled Mashal, who resided at the time in Jordan. The assassination attempt failed and the Mossad agents were captured by the Jordanian authorities. They were later released in exchange for the release of Sheikh Ahmed Yassin, the founder and "spiritual leader" of Hamas who was serving a life sentence in an Israeli prison.

See also 
 2002 Mahane Yehuda Market bombing

References



Explosions in 1997
Mass murder in 1997
Hamas suicide bombings
Terrorist incidents in Jerusalem
Marketplace attacks in Asia
July 1997 events in Asia
Islamic terrorist incidents in 1997
Terrorist incidents in Jerusalem in the 1990s